In enzymology, a glutaconyl-CoA decarboxylase is an enzyme that catalyzes the chemical reaction

4-carboxybut-2-enoyl-CoA  but-2-enoyl-CoA + CO2

Hence, this enzyme has one substrate, 4-carboxybut-2-enoyl-CoA, and two products, but-2-enoyl-CoA and CO2.

This enzyme belongs to the family of lyases, specifically the carboxy-lyases, which cleave carbon-carbon bonds.  The systematic name of this enzyme class is 4-carboxybut-2-enoyl-CoA carboxy-lyase (but-2-enoyl-CoA-forming). Other names in common use include glutaconyl coenzyme A decarboxylase, pent-2-enoyl-CoA carboxy-lyase, and 4-carboxybut-2-enoyl-CoA carboxy-lyase.  This enzyme participates in benzoate degradation via coa ligation and butanoate metabolism.

Structural studies

As of late 2007, only one structure has been solved for this class of enzymes, with the PDB accession code .

References

 
 

EC 4.1.1
Enzymes of known structure